The 2017–18 season is Esteghlal Football Club's 72nd season in existence and the club's 17th consecutive season in the top division of Iranian football. It covers a period from 1 July 2017 to 30 June 2018.

Players

Squad information
Players and squad numbers last updated on 8 July 2017.

Persian Gulf League Squad

AFC Champions League Squad

Transfers

In

Out

Pre-season and friendlies

Competitions

Overview

Iran Pro League

Standings

Results summary

Results by round

Matches

Hazfi Cup

AFC Champions League

Group stage

Round of 16

Statistics

Appearances and goals

|-
! colspan=14 style=background:#dcdcdc; text-align:center| Players transferred out during the season

Goalscorers

Last updated:

Clean sheets

Disciplinary record
Includes all competitive matches. Players with 1 card or more are included only.

References

External links
 Iran Premier League Statistics
 Persian League

Esteghlal F.C. seasons
Esteghlal